The Southern Conference is a conference within the National Junior College Athletic Association (NJCAA) Region 8. The conference consists of one private and five state and colleges located in Florida.

Members
Member institutions are:
ASA College Miami
Broward College
Eastern Florida State College
Indian River State College
Miami Dade College
Palm Beach State College

See also
National Junior College Athletic Association (NJCAA)
Florida State College Activities Association (FCSAA - the governing body of NJCAA Region 8)
Mid-Florida Conference, also in Region 8
Panhandle Conference, also in Region 8
Suncoast Conference, also in Region 8

References

External links
FSCAA/NJCAA Region 8 website
NJCAA Website

 
NJCAA conferences
College sports in Florida